Health in the United Kingdom refers to the overall health of the population of the United Kingdom. This includes overall trends such as life expectancy and mortality rates, mental health of the population and the suicide rate, smoking rates, alcohol consumption, prevalence of diseases within the population and obesity in the United Kingdom. Three of these, smoking rates, alcohol consumption and obesity are above the OECD average. 

Life expectancy in the country has consistently risen from the 18th century onward however in recent years since 2011 has stagnated and slowed down. This correlates with the additional decline of infant and general mortality rates as well since the 18th century. Social trends such as obesity rates within the country have consistently risen since the 1970's while smoking rates have consistently decreased since then. The prevalence of diseases such as HIV/AIDS is minuscule, with only 0.16% of the population affected by it.

Health status
The Nuffield Trust and the Association for Young People's Health produced a report on the health of young people in February 2019, comparing the UK with 18 other similar European countries.  They found that the UK had the highest rates of obesity, the highest rate of young people living with a longstanding condition, apart from Finland and Sweden, and, among 11 year olds, very low rates of exercise. The death rate from asthma and the teenage pregnancy rate were both amongst the highest. Indicators for obesity, longstanding illness, severe material deprivation and exercise levels were all deteriorating.

Life expectancy

In 2013 Life expectancy at birth for women was 83 years and for men 79 years.  Life expectancy in the UK is rising more slowly than in other comparable nations.  Austerity may be a cause. Underfunding of the NHS and Social care are blamed.  In 2018 life expectancy in the UK stopped increasing for the first time since 1982 when recording started. There were 50,100 excess deaths during winter 2017/2018 mostly among older people.  This is the highest since 1976.  Cold weather and problems with flu vaccine are blamed in addition to the claim that the NHS was underresourced, doctors and groups representing older people argue not enough was done to keep older people warm and safe.

Infant mortality

Infant mortality rates have been decreasing since the early 1840s, due to general improvements in sanitation and diet and more recently because of improvements in midwifery and neonatal intensive care.

Obesity

The rising rates of childhood obesity were described as a "national emergency" by Health Secretary Jeremy Hunt in February 2016.   28.1% of adults in the United Kingdom were recognised as clinically obese with a Body Mass Index (BMI) greater than 30 in 2014. The increasing numbers of people with obesity leads to the growing number of diabetes diagnoses.

Diabetes 
Diabetes is a major concern in the UK as the number of diagnoses have doubled in the past 15 years. In 2021 there were 4.1 million people in the UK diagnosed with diabetes, 90% of them having type 2. There were a further 1 million people with undiagnosed type 2 diabetes and 13.6 million people were at risk of developing type 2 diabetes, half of which could be prevented.

Smoking rates 

In 1974, 45% of the British population smoked. The smoking rate was down to 30% by the early-1990s, 21% by 2010, and 19.3% by 2013, the lowest level for eighty years. In 2015, smoking rates in England had fallen to 16.9%.

Cancer 

There were 361,216 cancer diagnoses in 2014 in the United Kingdom. Cancer Research UK estimates that 15% of UK cancers are caused by smoking, and 3-4% of UK cancers are related to alcohol consumption.

Mental health 

In 2014, the Adult Psychiatric Morbidity Survey reported that 17% of those surveyed in England met the criteria for a common mental disorder. About 37% of those were accessing mental health treatment. Those more severely affected were more likely to be accessing services. In 2017 a survey found that 65% of Britons have experienced a mental health problem, with 26% having had a panic attack and 42% said they had suffered from depression.

Benefit cuts and sanctions "are having a toxic impact on mental health" according to the UK Council for Psychotherapy. Rates of severe anxiety and depression among unemployed people increased from 10.1% in June 2013 to 15.2% in March 2017.  In the general population the increase was from 3.4% to 4.1%.

Suicide 

5,608 and 5,675 people aged 15 and over died by suicide in 2009 to 2011 respectively. The share of deaths percentage wise in which suicide has contributed to has roughly remained under 1% since the 1990's. The most recent figures for 2019 show that suicides made up 0.9% of deaths in the United Kingdom.

Drug-related deaths

HIV/AIDS 

An estimated 101,200 people are living with HIV in the UK (0.16% of the population), 13% of whom are unaware of their infection. Of those, 69% are men and 31% were women. Just under half of those living with HIV are gay or bisexual men. 1 in 7 gay or bisexual men in London are living with HIV, compared to 1 in 25 in the rest of the UK and less than 1 in 500 for the general population.

6,095 people were newly diagnosed during 2015, a trend which has remained relatively constant since 2010. An estimated 39% of diagnoses were late (likely to have been living with the virus for over three years).

Disability 

In 2014 more than 11 million British people (excluding Northern Ireland) were reported to have a long term impairment or disability. The incidence rises with age. About 6% of children, 16% of working age adults and 45% of pensioners are reported as having a disability.

Vaccination

In the United Kingdom, the purchase and distribution of vaccines is managed centrally, and recommended vaccines are provided for free by the NHS. In the UK, no laws require vaccination of schoolchildren.

Social and economic issues 
The Black Report, published by the Conservative government in 1980, highlighted the relationship between socioeconomic status and health outcomes. It demonstrated greater inequality of mortality between occupational classes I and V both in 1970–72 and 1959–63 than in 1949–53.

The decline in performance of the NHS since 2016 is said to give the British population the worst access to healthcare in Europe and it is suggested as a significant cause of increased disability and reduction in economic activity, especially for people with mental health problems.  People on the periphery of society who were already exposed to greater health risks are thought to have particular difficulties.

See also
Healthcare in the United Kingdom
Health in England
:Category:Health disasters in the United Kingdom
:Category:Diseases and disorders in the United Kingdom
:Category:Drugs in the United Kingdom
:Category:Public health in the United Kingdom

References